Ugo Pendini (August 14, 1853 – 1895) was an Italian painter.

Biography
While he was a resident of Messina, he was born in Venice. From 1875 to 1880, he attended the Academy of Fine Arts of Florence. He then moved to Naples, to study under Domenico Morelli at the Academy of Fine Arts, but within a year Morelli had left the academy, and Pendini returned to Florence, then Rome and Venice. He was known as portraitist and painter or figures. Among his paintings were Il Giocatore exhibited at the Brera in Milan, reproduced in the Illustrazione Italiana, a journal by the publishing house of Treves. He also painted portraits of his own family, Signora Rosselli Nathan, professor Rasi, and others. He painted picturesque vedute of the Venetian Lagoon, which were desired by English patrons.

References

1853 births
1895 deaths
19th-century Italian painters
Italian male painters
Painters from Venice
Accademia di Belle Arti di Firenze alumni
19th-century Italian male artists